The Coffee, Sugar and Cocoa Exchange (CSCE) was founded in 1882 as the Coffee Exchange in the City of New York. Sugar futures were added in 1914, and, on September 28, 1979, the New York Coffee and Sugar Exchange merged with the New York Cocoa Exchange (which in turn had been founded in 1925) to form CSCE.  In 1998, CSCE merged with the New York Cotton Exchange as subsidiaries of the New York Board of Trade (NYBOT).  The CSCE operates as an independent unit of NYBOT trading futures and options on coffee, sugar and cocoa and the S&P Commodity Index.  Trading is by open outcry, from 8 a.m. to 2:45 p.m., Monday through Friday.  In January 2007, NYBOT merged with IntercontinentalExchange (ICE) and became a wholly owned subsidiary of ICE.

Key people

At the end of April 1902, H. M. Humphreys resigned from his position as superintendent of the Coffee Exchange to become vice president of the newly formed Mutual Alliance Trust Company.

Coffee broker Joseph J. O'Donohue was a founder of the Coffee Exchange, New York's City Commissioner of Parks,  and a founder of the Brooklyn-New York Ferry.

Lehman Brothers became a member of the Coffee Exchange as early as 1883, five years before joining the New York Stock Exchange in 1887.

In 1909 writer Vincent O'Sullivan lost his income from the family coffee business when his brother Percy made a spectacularly mistimed futures gamble at the New York Coffee Exchange. The entire family was ruined, and Vincent was destitute for the remaining years of his life.

Some major U.S. commodities exchanges, like the New York Coffee Exchange and the Chicago Mercantile Exchange did not begin using clearing houses to settle their transactions until the second decade of the 20th century. The New York Coffee Exchange began using clearing houses in 1914.

See also
New York Produce Exchange
Economics of coffee
History of coffee

Notes

External links

 Official ICE site

Financial services companies established in 1882
Coffee organizations
Food and drink companies based in New York City
Commodity exchanges in the United States
1882 establishments in New York (state)
American companies established in 1882
Financial services companies based in New York City
Agricultural organizations based in the United States
Coffee in the United States
Chocolate industry
Sugar industry